John Leckie Hannigan (born 17 February 1933) was a Scottish professional footballer who played as a winger for Sunderland.

References

1933 births
Living people
People from Barrhead
Scottish footballers
Association football wingers
Maryhill Harp F.C. players
Greenock Morton F.C. players
Sunderland A.F.C. players
Derby County F.C. players
Bradford (Park Avenue) A.F.C. players
Weymouth F.C. players
Bath City F.C. players
English Football League players
Sportspeople from East Renfrewshire